The Global Learning and Observations to Benefit the Environment (GLOBE) Program is a worldwide hands-on, science and education program focusing on the environment, now active in over 120 countries worldwide. It works to promote the teaching and learning of science, enhance environmental literacy and stewardship, and promote scientific discovery. Students and teachers collect data and perform research in collaboration with scientists from numerous international agencies, and their work is made accessible through the GLOBE website.

Background

The GLOBE Program seeks to teach young students experimental skills using real experiments and equipment. Students, teachers, and scientists collaborate in a unique global learning network.
 
The program is housed by the University Corporation for Atmospheric Research (UCAR) in Boulder, Colorado, and sponsored by NASA (National Aeronautics and Space Administration),  NOAA (National Oceanic and Atmospheric Administration ),  and the National Science Foundation, through an inter-agency agreement signed in 1998.  The U.S. Department of State supports the work of the GLOBE Program internationally (see for example the agreement with Mexico); many other organizations support the GLOBE Program in the US and around the world.

Mission

The GLOBE Program's Mission is to promote the teaching and learning of science, enhance environmental literacy and stewardship, and promote scientific discovery.

Specific goals include:

 Improve student achievement across the curriculum with a focus on student research in environmental and Earth system science;
 Enhance awareness and support activities of individuals throughout the world to benefit the environment;
 Contribute to scientific understanding of Earth as a system;
 Connect and inspire the next generation of global scientists; and
 Get young minds outside to explore new things.

History

 1995: The GLOBE Program launched by former US vice-president Al Gore on Earth Day, April 22
 1997: GLOBE Teacher Conference held in the US
 1998: 1st GLOBE Learning Expedition (GLE) held in Finland
 2000: 2nd GLE held in the USA
 2003: 53 protocols across atmosphere, biosphere, hydrosphere, and soil (pedosphere)
 2003: 3rd GLE held in Croatia
 2003: NASA selected the University Corporation for Atmospheric Research (UCAR), to operate The GLOBE Program Office
 2005: Earth Day; GLOBE celebrates its 10th birthday with 15,000 schools in 106 countries
 2008: 4th GLE held in South Africa
 2009: 20 million data in the global database
 2011: Student Climate Research Campaign launches
 2014: 1st regional student aerosols research campaign led by Europe and Eurasia; Global Precipitation Measurement (GPM) and Soil Moisture Active Passive (SMAP), student research campaigns with NASA launched
 2014: 5th GLE held in India
 2014: NASA selected the University Corporation for Atmospheric Research (UCAR) to operate The GLOBE Implementation Office
 2015: Earth Day, GLOBE celebrates its 20th birthday; GLOBE launches new data entry app for schools, an enhanced website, and an updated teacher's guide; 51 protocols in the Program; 128 million data entries in the international database
 2016: GLOBE provides online eTraining; hosts International Virtual Science Fair and six regional U.S. science fairs, and various student scientific campaigns 
 2016: Launch of GLOBE Observer app
 2017: Data reaches over 140 million measurements; International Virtual Science Symposium increases in number of submitted projects and worldwide representation, and new mosquito protocol
 2018: 6th GLE held in Ireland

Activities for learning

The GLOBE Program provides the opportunity for students to learn by taking scientifically valid measurements in the fields of atmosphere, hydrology, soils, land cover, and phenology, depending upon their local curricula. Students report their data through the Internet, create maps and graphs to analyze data sets, and collaborate with scientists and other GLOBE students around the world. All the GLOBE data and observations are in the public domain.

Contribution by scientists

Members of the international science community are involved in the design and implementation of the GLOBE Program. Scientists are involved in helping select GLOBE environmental measurements, developing measurement procedures, and ensuring overall quality control of data. This is important to ensure that other scientists have confidence about these results and their findings. Their continued support and direction helps to ensure that GLOBE environmental measurements make a significant contribution to the global environmental database.

See also 
 GLOBE at Night

References

Notes

Additional sources 
 NASA Selects Colorado Organization to Operate Globe Program
 What is the GLOBE program

External links
 

Regional sites
 Africa Region
 Asia-Pacific Region 
 Europe-Eurasia Region
 Latin America-Caribbean Region
 Near East-North Africa Region
 North America Region
 Australia
 Japan 

Meteorology and climate education
NASA programs
National Oceanic and Atmospheric Administration
National Science Foundation
United States Department of State
Earth sciences organizations
Scientific organizations based in the United States
Scientific organizations established in 1995
1995 establishments in Colorado